Sherman Historic District may refer to:

in the United States (by state)
Sherman Historic District (Sherman, Connecticut), listed on the National Register of Historic Places (NRHP) in Connecticut
Sherman Hill Historic District, Des Moines, Iowa, listed on the NRHP
Sherman Historic District (Sioux Falls, South Dakota), listed on the NRHP in South Dakota
Sherman Avenue Historic District, Madison, Wisconsin, listed on the NRHP in Dane County

See also
Sherman House (disambiguation)
The Sherman (disambiguation)